Petrie is a suburb in the Moreton Bay Region, Queensland, Australia.

Geography 
The southern boundary of the suburb is marked by the North Pine River.

Petrie is a suburban village with new housing developments on land which was previously used for pine plantations and agriculture.  Petrie railway station provides access to regular Queensland Rail City network services to Brisbane and Ipswich, as well as Caboolture and the Sunshine Coast. There are also commuter rail services to Kippa-Ring (Redcllife) via the newly built Redcliffe branch railway line.

The Gympie Road, Dayboro Road and Anzac Avenue junction, and surrounding area encompass the town centre which includes establishments, such as retail, commerce, accommodation, cosmetology, health, education, sport and mechanical industries and establishments. There are also police, fire brigade and ambulance establishments in the town centre.

The Moreton Bay campus of the University of the Sunshine Coast is situated in Petrie on the site of the former Amcor Paper Mill.

History
Petrie is situated in the Yugarabul traditional Indigenous Australian country.

Thomas Petrie established his homestead Murrumba on a bend on the Pine River in 1858. Tom Petrie was part of the Petrie family, who were the first free settlers in Queensland and who established their prominent construction business in 1840. Murrumba was an important stopping point on the route to the goldfields in Gympie. Tom Petrie subdivided a portion of his land to create the town, initially known as North Pine.

On Sunday 6 July 1873 North Pine Presbyterian Church was officially opened by Reverend M. McGavin.

North Pine River Provisional School opened on 22 April 1874. In 1879 it became Pine River North State School. In 1896 it was renamed North Pine State School. In 1956 it became Petrie State School.

Harrison's Pocket Provisional School opened on 31 January 1876. On 18 February 1884 it became Harrison's Pocket State School. It closed in 1937.

On Saturday 25 August 1888, Lady Musgrave (wife of Governor Musgrave) laid the foundation stone for St Thomas' Anglican church in North Pine. The church was officially opened on Friday 21 December 1888.

North Pine School of Arts was built in 1889 and was officially opened on 28 January 1890 by Charles Powers, the Queensland Minister for Education. A special train was provided to bring visitors from Brisbane to attend the opening. The School of Arts has been used by the community over the years for many social and cultural activities purposes, including meetings, concerts, dances, movies, and as a library.  

The Phoenix Masonic Lodge founded in 1894. Since 1929 Phoenix Lodge has been meeting at the Petrie Masonic Centre in Whites Road.

In July 1911 (after Tom Petrie's death) the North Pine railway station was renamed Petrie railway station. The suburb takes its name from the railway station. Tom Petrie was a highly regarded individual in the area through his community work and his cooperation with the local Indigenous Australian inhabitants.  Tom Petrie had written significant information about his research in South-East Queensland regarding Indigenous Australian culture, travels and work. On Saturday 15 July 1911, a freestone monument to Thomas Petrie was unveiled by Sir William MacGregor, the Queensland Governor. It is outside the North Pine School of Arts in Petrie Place Park, 1014-1030 Anzac Avenue.

In 1957, Australian Paper Manufacturers (now Amcor) established their Petrie paper mill on a  site, formerly two dairy farms. It was officially opened on 6 December 1957 by the Prime Minister, Robert Menzies. It was the largest industrial development in southern Queensland at the time. It created an economic stimulus that transformed Petrie from a small farming town into a growing residential area. The mill closed in 2013. Moreton Bay Regional Council purchased the site for tertiary education as part of an innovation and knowledge precinct and, in 2015, entered into a partnership with the University of the Sunshine Coast to develop the site, with construction commencing in June 2018. On 9 March 2020, the foundation building was opened by Peter Dutton, the local member for the Australian House of Representatives for Dickson.

Our Lady of the Way School opened on 3 February 1964.

Kurwongbah State School opened on 28 January 1986.

Kolbe College was established in 1987 by the Daughters of Charity. It was later renamed Mt Maria College Petrie.

The median age of the Petrie population was 34 years, 3 years below the national median of 37.  78.6% of people living in Petrie were born in Australia. The other top responses for country of birth were England 5.9%, New Zealand 4.6%, South Africa 1%, Scotland 0.6%, Philippines 0.6%.  92.8% of people spoke only English at home; the next most common languages were 0.5% Afrikaans, 0.3% Dutch, 0.3% Italian, 0.3% Samoan, 0.3% Spanish.

Heritage listings 
Petrie has a number of heritage-listed sites, including:
 Anzac Memorial Avenue (the road itself)
 former Murrumba Homestead Grounds: now within the grounds of Our Lady of the Way School, 38 Armstrong Street
 Petrie State School: 42 Dayboro Road (Brisbane Woodford Road)
 Petrie Roadside Rest Area, one of the North Coast Roadside Rest Areas: Wyllie Park, 980 Gympie Road
 Sweeney's Reserve: 1A Old Dayboro Road

Education

Petrie State School is a government primary (Prep-6) school for boys and girls at 42 Dayboro Road. In 2018, the school had an enrolment of 582 students with 48 teachers (39 full-time equivalent) and 36 non-teaching staff (20 full-time equivalent). It includes a special education program.

Kurwongbah State School is a government primary (Prep-6) school for boys and girls at Eacham Street. In 2018, the school had an enrolment of 933 students with 69 teachers (61 full-time equivalent) and 50 non-teaching staff (27 full-time equivalent). It includes a special education program.

Our Lady of the Way School is a Catholic primary (Prep-6) school for boys and girls at 38 Armstrong Street. In 2018, the school had an enrolment of 327 students with 27 teachers (22 full-time equivalent) and 22 non-teaching staff (13 full-time equivalent).

Mt Maria College Petrie is a Catholic secondary (7-12) school for boys and girls at Armstrong Street. In 2018, the school had an enrolment of 373 students with 44 teachers (41 full-time equivalent) and 44 non-teaching staff (33 full-time equivalent).

Moreton Bay campus of the University of the Sunshine Coast is at 1 Moreton Parade, the former site of the Australian Paper Manufacturers' paper mill.

There is no government secondary school in Petrie. The nearest government secondary schools are Pine Rivers State High School in Strathpine to the south and Dakabin State High School in Dakabin to the north.

Amenities

The North Pine School of Arts is at 1018 Anzac Ave; it is available for rental for community events.

The Phoenix Masonic Lodge meets at the Petrie Masonic Centre in Whites Road.

The Pine Rivers branch of the Queensland Country Women's Association meets at the QCWA Hall at 1058 Anzac Avenue.

The Moreton Bay Regional Council operates a mobile library service, which visits Mathieson Park on Mundin Street.

Attractions 
Tourism in Petrie is mainly focused on recreation. Recreational activities, such as bushwalking, canoeing, fishing and horseriding take place.

See also 

 Petrie Airfield
 Petrie Terrace, Queensland

References

External links

 

 
Suburbs of Moreton Bay Region